Agrionympha jansella is a species of moth belonging to the family Micropterigidae. It was described by George W. Gibbs and Niels P. Kristensen in 2011. It is found in South Africa, where it is known only from Karkloof Falls in the Eastern Cape.

The length of the forewings is about 3.2 mm for females.

Etymology
The species is named in honour of Anthonie Johannes Theodorus Janse, who revealed the presence of micropterigids in southern Africa when he collected Agrionympha pseliacma at the same locality as A. jansella (Karkloof Falls) in 1917.

References

Endemic moths of South Africa
Micropterigidae
Moths described in 2011
Moths of Africa